These are the official results of the Women's 10,000 metres race at the 1996 Summer Olympics in Atlanta, Georgia. There were a total of 35 competitors.

Results

Heats
Qualification: First 8 in each heat (Q) and the next 4 fastest (q) qualified to the final.

Final

See also
 1992 Women's Olympic 10.000 metres (Barcelona)
 1993 Women's World Championships 10.000 metres (Stuttgart)
 1994 Women's European Championships 10.000 metres (Helsinki)
 1995 Women's World Championships 10.000 metres (Gothenburg)
 1997 Women's World Championships 10.000 metres (Athens)

References

External links
 Official Report
 Results
 Race on YouTube

1
10,000 metres at the Olympics
1996 in women's athletics
Women's events at the 1996 Summer Olympics